Michael Meeks is a British software developer. He is primarily known for his work on GNOME, OpenOffice.org and now LibreOffice. He has been a major contributor to the GNOME project for a long time working on its infrastructure and associated applications, particularly CORBA, Bonobo, Nautilus and GNOME accessibility.  He was hired as a Ximian developer by Nat Friedman and Miguel de Icaza in mid-2000 , continuing at Novell, SuSE and then Collabora.

Meeks is a free software hacker who has contributed a lot of time to decreasing program load time. He created the direct binding, hashvals, and dynsort implementations for GNU Binutils and glibc. Most of this work was focused at making OpenOffice.org and now its fork LibreOffice start faster, and was later subsumed into the "-hash-style=gnu" linking optimization. His work on iogrind also allows applications to be profiled and optimized to first-time (or 'cold') start far more rapidly .

He supports LibreOffice and Evolution as the free software solutions for document editing and groupware.

Previously he worked for Quantel gaining expertise in real time AV editing and playback achieved with high performance focused hardware/software solutions.

Meeks is a Christian, which he says made him think about the moral aspects of his own illegal use of non-free software and converted him finally to free software.

References

External links 
 Michael Meeks's Twitter feed

Alumni of the University of Cambridge
British Christians
British computer programmers
GNOME developers
Living people
People educated at Christ's Hospital
Technology evangelists
LibreOffice
Year of birth missing (living people)